Poland Ekstraklasa, meaning "Extra Class" in Polish, named PKO Ekstraklasa since the 2019–20 season due to its sponsorship by PKO Bank Polski, is the top Polish professional league for men's association football teams. 

Contested by 18 clubs, operating a system of promotion and relegation with the I liga, seasons start in July, and end in May or June the following year. Teams play a total of 34 games each. Games are played on Fridays, Saturdays, Sundays and Mondays. The winner of the Ekstraklasa qualifies for the Polish SuperCup. The league is now operated by the Ekstraklasa Spółka Akcyjna.

The Ekstraklasa (former I liga) was officially formed as Liga Polska on 4–5 December 1926 in Warsaw, since 1 March 1927 as Liga Piłki Nożnej, but the Polish Football Association (Polish: Polski Związek Piłki Nożnej, PZPN) had been in existence since 20 December 1919, a year after the independence of Poland in 1918. The first games of the freshly created league took place on 3 April 1927, while first national non-league football championship took place in 1920.

A total of 82 teams have played in the top division of Polish football since the founding of the league, of which 17 clubs have won the title. The current champions are Lech Poznań, who won their 8th title in 2021–22 season.

History

Naming 
2004: Idea Ekstraklasa
2005-2009: Orange Ekstraklasa
2011-2015: T-Mobile Ekstraklasa
2016-2018: Lotto Ekstraklasa
2019-: PKO BP Ekstraklasa

Creation of the Polish Football League 
On 4–5 December 1926 in Warsaw, representatives from several Polish clubs met for the purpose of discussing the creation of a league. It is unknown where the idea of a Polish league originated from, however a national league was thought to be a much more practical solution than hitherto practiced two-stage system of regional matches followed by a national match.

To dismay of clubs' officials, the PZPN was not receptive to the idea of a national league and therefore sought to thwart it. However, it turned out that virtually all but one of the Polish clubs supported the idea. The decision to create it was made regardless what PZPN's representatives thought of it. In late February 1927, at the PZPN's meeting in Warsaw, its officials openly opposed the formation of a league, but the clubs, allegedly egged on by some generals from the Polish Army (which, after May Coup of 1926, played a key role in all aspects of public life), proceeded anyway. The creation of the League was announced on 1 March 1927.

Cracovia 
The only opponent of the league's formation was Cracovia – a very influential and strong organization in Polish football of the 1920s. Cracovia's boycott was because its chairman, Dr. Edward Cetnarowski, at the same time held the post of the director of the PZPN. Cetnarowski was a personality known not only in Poland, but also in other countries. It was due to his efforts that in September 1923, Cracovia toured Spain, drawing 1–1 with Barcelona and losing 0–1 to Real Madrid. In October, also thanks to Cetnarowski, Sevilla travelled to Kraków, losing 2–3 to Cracovia.

Early years of the league 

Games of the first championships started on 3 April 1927. All major teams (except for Cracovia) took part in it. This is the list of the teams (in the order they finished in November 1927):

In this first season of the league, fight for championship was decided between two powerful teams – Wisła Kraków and 1.FC Katowice. This rivalry was treated very seriously, not only by the two sides involved, but also by the whole nation. 1.FC was regarded as the team supported by German minority, while Wisła, at the end of this historic season, represented ambitions of all Poles.

Some time in the fall of 1927 in Katowice, an ill-fated game between 1.FC and Wisła took place. Stakes were very high – the winner would become the champion. Kraków's side won 2–0 and became the champion. 1.FC finished second, third was Warta Poznań.

1927–1932: dominance of Kraków teams 
In 1928 Cracovia finally decided to enter the league, which was gladly accepted by all fans of football. However, championships were once again won by Wisła, with such excellent players as Henryk Reyman, Mieczysław Balcer and Jan Kotlarczyk. Warta Poznań was second and Legia Warsaw third. This was also the last year of 1.FC's glory. The team finished fifth, to be relegated forever at the end of 1929 season.

In 1929 yet another team (after Cracovia, Pogon Lwów and Wisła) was added to the list of champions of Poland. This time it was Warta Poznań, which finished one point ahead of Garbarnia Kraków.

However, after the last game, on 1 December 1929, it was Garbarnia Kraków that was celebrating the championship. Two weeks later, in mid-December, PZPN's officials changed the result of the Warta – Klub Turystow Łódź game. Originally, Warta lost 1–2, but due to walkover (it was decided that one of Łódź's players did not have all necessary documents), this was changed to 3–0 in favor of Poznań's side.  As a result of the decision, Warta (with 33 points) became the champion, Garbarnia finished second with 32 points and Klub Turystow was relegated.

In 1930, Cracovia regained the championship, (to repeat this success in 1932) and a year later another Kraków's side, Garbarnia, won the league. It is clear that the 1927–1932 period was marked by dominance of teams from Kraków. During this time, only once (Warta Poznań, 1929) the championship was won by a side from a different city. The 1931 champion, Garbarnia, was unique as this was the first time that the league had been won by a side whose all players had been bought from other teams.

1933–1939: Upper Silesian dominance 
As has been said, the early 1930s marked a decline of the dominance of Kraków and Lwów as centers of Polish football. The point of gravity slowly moved towards west – to Polish part of Upper Silesia, which had belonged to Poland since 1921 (see: Silesian Uprisings). In 1932 the champion was Cracovia, but starting in 1933, Ruch Chorzów (then: Ruch Wielkie Hajduki) completely dominated the league, being the champion for four times in a row.

Ruch, with such excellent players as Teodor Peterek, Ernest Wilimowski and Gerard Wodarz was by far the best team in those years. For example, in 1934 it finished seven points ahead of second Cracovia. Other important teams of these years were: Cracovia, Wisła Kraków, Pogoń Lwów and Warta Poznań.

In 1933 and 1934 there were 12 teams in the League. In 1935 this number was cut to 11 and in 1936 – to 10. Football officials did it on purpose – with fewer teams, the competition was supposed to be harder, which would attract fans to the stadiums. However, supporters' turnout was not impressive, with Ruch Chorzów as the most popular team, both at home and away.

In late 1935 (the league held its games in the spring-summer-fall system) fans were shocked to find that Cracovia, the legend of this sport, was relegated to the A-class. Kraków's side absence lasted for a year – it returned in 1937, to become the champion.

Ruch Chorzów was still the dominant team, winning the Championships in 1936 and 1938. In 1937 Ruch's streak of four consecutive champions was broken by Cracovia, and in 1939 the championships were not finished. By 31 August 1939, after some 12 games, Ruch was the leader of the 10-team League. Last games of this summer occurred on 20 August. Then, a break was planned, because the National Team was going to play a few international friendlies. Games were to be re-introduced on 10 September.

This is the list of the ten teams that participated in last, historic games for championships of interwar Poland. Teams are presented according to their position on the table, as of 31 August 1939:

Ruch Chorzów
Wisła Kraków
Pogoń Lwów
AKS Chorzów
Warta Poznań
Cracovia
Polonia Warsaw
Garbarnia Kraków
Warszawianka Warsaw
Union Touring Łódź

After World War II 
As a result of the Second World War, the borders of Poland changed significantly. Lwów, one of the centers of Polish football (with such teams as Pogoń Lwów, Czarni Lwów and Lechia Lwów) was annexed by Soviet Union and all these teams ceased to exist. Lwów's football officials and players moved westwards, creating such clubs as Polonia Bytom, Odra Opole and Pogoń Szczecin (see: Recovered Territories). Another important center, Wilno (with the team Śmigły Wilno), was also annexed by the Soviets (see: Polish areas annexed by the Soviet Union). In exchange, Poland gained a large swath of formerly German territory in particular in Silesia, with its capital Wrocław (home of double champion Śląsk Wrocław) and towns such as Zabrze (home of 14-times champion Górnik Zabrze), Bytom (home of champions Polonia Bytom and Szombierki Bytom) and Lubin (home of double champion Zagłębie Lubin). 18 teams played in the league between seasons of 1992 and 1998.

Clubs 
There are 18 clubs in the Ekstraklasa. During the course of the season each club plays the others twice, once at their home stadium and once at that of their opponents, for a total of 34 games. From the 2013–14 till the 2019–20 season, after the 30th round the table was divided into 'champion' (top eight teams) and 'relegation' (bottom eight teams) groups. Each team played seven more games (teams ranked 1–4 and 9–12 would host four games at home). The 2016–17 season was the last when teams started an extra round with half the points (rounded up) achieved during the first phase of 30 matches. The changes extended the season to a total of 296 matches played. The 2021–22 season started with 18 teams, instead of 16.

Clubs as of the 2022–23 season.

 Upgrading to 31,871.
 Upgrading to 20,500.
 Due to the renovation of the Stadion im. Braci Czachorów in Radom, Radomiak play their home matches at the Stadion Lekkoatletyczno-Piłkarski in Radom.
 Due to the renovation of Warta Poznań Stadium in Poznań, Warta play their home matches at the Stadion Dyskobolii in Grodzisk Wielkopolski.

List of champions 

°Abandoned due to the outbreak of World War II. On 31 August 1939 Ruch Chorzów was the leader.
°°In 1951, the Polish Football Association decided to give the Champion of Poland title to the winner of the Polish Cup, in order to increase the importance of the re-activated cup competition. Ruch Chorzów was 6th in the league, but won the cup, beating 2-0 Wisła Kraków in the final game. Wisła Kraków was announced the league champion.

Performance by club
Note: This list is not synonymous with a list of Polish football champions. Bold indicates clubs playing in the top division in the 2022–23 season.

The following table lists the league champions by the Polish voivodeship regions (current, valid since 1999).

The following table lists the league champions by city.

Honored teams 
After 10 Polish Championship titles a representative golden star is placed above the team's badge to indicate 10 Polish Championship titles. 
 
The current (as of May 2021) officially sanctioned Championship stars are:
Golden star: 10 or more Polish Championship titles:
 Górnik Zabrze
 Legia Warsaw
 Ruch Chorzów
 Wisła Kraków
Silver star: 5–9 Polish Championship titles:
 Cracovia
 Lech Poznań
White star: 1–4 Polish Championship titles:
ŁKS Łódź
Piast Gliwice
Polonia Bytom
Polonia Warszawa
Śląsk Wrocław
Warta Poznań
Widzew Łódź
Zagłębie Lubin

All-time league table 
The all-time league table consists of all the teams that once participated in the Ekstraklasa. Data from the 1927 – 2018–19 seasons.

Source: Tabela wszech czasów Ekstraklasy (1927–2019) 90minut.pl

From 1927 to 2022 a total of 82 teams contested in the Ekstraklasa.

Bold- indicates teams currently playing in the Ekstraklasa 2022–23 season.

Explanation 
1. An equal number of points on the basis of their goal difference, then greater number of goals scored.
2. In seasons 1927 – 1994–95 for a win awarded 2 points and 1 point for a draw. In seasons 1986–87 – 1989–90 for win at least three goals difference additionally awarded 1 point, while a losses at least 3 goals difference subtracted one point. Since the season 1995–96 for win gives 3 points and 1 point for a draw.
3. Included additional qualification games between both teams and league championship and remain in the league (including 11 games in 1948, 1986–87, 1987–88, 1988–89) and was not included in the table play-off for the right to play in the league between teams of different class divisions.
4. Included matches with unfinished 1939 season.

Penalty points 
Includes penalties imposed by the Football Association:

 In the season 1934 in the meeting Garbarnia Kraków – ŁKS Łódź held bilateral forfeit 0:3 (match did not take place due to the fault of both teams).
 Matches of the season 1986–87 (Lech Poznań – Polonia Bytom 1:1, Olimpia Poznań – Stal Mielec 1:3, Zagłębie Lubin – Ruch Chorzów 0:2) and the season 1992–93 (Wisła Kraków – Legia Warsaw 0:6, ŁKS Łódź – Olimpia Poznań 7:1 ) on suspicion settings results have been verified as completed, but the teams received points places and infield (and this is included in the table). More: Sunday of Miracles.
 In the season 1993–94 Legia Warsaw, Wisła Kraków and ŁKS Łódź started the game with a negative account (−3 points) as punishment for the events of the final round of the season 1992–93.
 In the season 2009–10 Jagiellonia Białystok was penalized 10 points deduction for participating in the corruption scandal.
 In the season 2012–13 Zagłębie Lubin was penalized 3 points for participating in the corruption scandal.
 In the season 2015–16 Wisła Kraków, Górnik Zabrze, Lechia Gdańsk and Ruch Chorzów were penalized 1 points for failing with licensing requirements. 
 In the season 2016–17 Ruch Chorzów was penalized 4 points for failing with licensing requirements.
 In the season 2020–21 Cracovia was penalized 5 points for participating in the corruption scandal  during the 2003–04 II liga season.

Mergers and acquisitions teams 
With the following mergers and acquisitions teams:

 The combination Union Łódź and Klub Turystów Łódź at Union-Touring Łódź (1932) – the balance Klub Turystów and Union-Touring counted together.
 The combination Rymer Niedobczyce and Błyskawica Radlin at Górnik Radlin (1949) – the balance Rymer and Górnik counted together.
 The combination Sokół Pniewy and GKS Tychy at Sokół Tychy (1995) – the balance of the Sokół Pniewy and Sokół Tychy is counted together.
 The combination Olimpia Poznań and Lechia Gdańsk at Lechia/Olimpia Gdańsk (1995) – the balance Lechia/Olimpia Gdańsk is included in the balance sheet Lechia Gdańsk.
 The combination Amica Wronki and Lech Poznań (2006) – Lech Poznań balance before and after the merger is counted together.
 The combination Dyskobolia Grodzisk Wielkopolski and Polonia Warsaw (2008) – Polonia Warsaw balance before and after the merger is counted together.

Top goalscorers

Players

All-time top goalscorers

All-time most appearances

League presidents

Corruption scandal 

Several clubs have been involved in a corruption scandal and were/are in danger of relegation:

Arka Gdynia – relegated from 1st to 2nd division, −5 points at the start of 2007/08 season
Cracovia – –5 points at the start of the 2020–21 season, fine of 1,000,000 zloty.
Górnik Łęczna – relegated from 1st to 3rd division, −6 points at the start of 2007/08 season
Górnik Polkowice – 70 000 zł penalty, relegated from 2nd to 4th division, −6 points at the start of 2007/08 season
Jagiellonia Białystok – docked 10 points at the start of the 2009/10 season, fine of 300,000 zloty
KSZO Ostrowiec Świętokrzyski – relegated from 2nd to 3rd division, – 6 points at the start of 2007/08 season
Zagłębie Sosnowiec – at the end of 2007/08 they were relegated from the top division to the 3rd, as they finished the season in the relegation zone, plus one division lower due to corruption.
Korona Kielce – at the end of 2007/08 they were relegated one level lower due to corruption.
Zagłębie Lubin (Polish champion 2006–2007) – at the end of 2007/08 they were relegated one level lower due to corruption.

Statistics

UEFA coefficients

The following data indicates Polish coefficient rankings between European football leagues.

Country ranking
UEFA League Ranking for the 2016–2021 period:

 28.  (33)  Nemzeti Bajnokság I (15.500)
 29.  (25)  Belarusian Premier League (15.250)
 30.  (29)  Ekstraklasa (15.125)
 31.  (32)  Slovenian PrvaLiga (14.250)
 32.  (30)  Slovak Super Liga (13.625)

Club ranking
UEFA 5-year Club Ranking for the 2016–2021 period:
 98.  Legia Warsaw (16.500)
 187.  Lech Poznań (6.000)
 284. Piast Gliwice (4.000)
 322.  Jagiellonia Białystok (3.025)
 323. Cracovia (3.025)
 324. Lechia Gdańsk (3.025)
 325.  Górnik Zabrze (3.025)
 326.  Arka Gdynia (3.025)
 327. Zagłębie Lubin (3.025)

Television 

All matches from the 2011–12 are telecast live nationally by Canal+ Poland. From 2019–20 Telewizja Polska has the rights to air live 1 game per week on a non-scrambled channel.

See also

 Football in Poland
 List of foreign Ekstraklasa players
 List of Polish football champions
 List of sports attendance figures

Notes

References

External links 

 Official website 
 Ekstraklasa's goals and highlights  
 PSN Futbol – Ekstraklasa league table, results and news 

 
1
Poland
Professional sports leagues in Poland